Jamaica is an unincorporated community in Glynn County, in the U.S. state of Georgia.

History
A post office called Jamaica was established in 1872, and remained in operation until 1905. The community was named after Jamaica, New York, the home of a railroad promoter.

References

Unincorporated communities in Glynn County, Georgia
Unincorporated communities in Georgia (U.S. state)